Teiu River may refer to:
 Teiu, a tributary of the Lotru in Vâlcea County, Romania
 Teiul, a tributary of the Baboia in Dolj County, Romania